Daimiel is a municipality in Ciudad Real, Castile-La Mancha, Spain. It has a population of 17,342, and a mechanical industry. The football club is Daimiel CF. The Tablas de Daimiel National Park, a well-known but endangered wetland natural reserve, lies partly within the boundaries of the town.

History
Daimiel is the location of the Motilla del Azuer, a Bronze Age fortification. 

The "Martyrs of Daimiel" were killed here in 1936 during the Spanish Civil War.

References

Municipalities in the Province of Ciudad Real